New Life Christian Academy (NLCA) is a PK–12 private, Christian, co-educational school in Millbrook, Alabama, United States. It was established in 1979 as an extension of New Life Church with an original student body of six.

Athletics 
New Life Christian Academy participates in football, baseball, volleyball, basketball, softball, and cheerleading. NLCA is affiliated with the Alabama Christian Athletic Association and with the Christian Football Association (eight man division).

For the 2018–2019 school year, it won two state championships for their division. The NLCA golf team and the softball team won state for their respective divisions. The volleyball team won the Tiger Jam Tournament in August 2018. In 2019, a student at NLCA won the Heart of the Champion award for softball.

Demographics 
Demographics of the students enrolled in 2015–2016 school year according to the National Center for Education Statistics are:
 White - 80.32%
 Black - 4.02% 
 Hispanic - 2.01%
 Asian - 1.61% 
 American Indian/Alaska Native - 0.4%
 Native Hawaiian/Pacific Islander - 0.4% 
 Two or More Races - 1.61%

References

External links 
 

Schools in Elmore County, Alabama
Private elementary schools in Alabama
Private middle schools in Alabama
Private high schools in Alabama
Educational institutions established in 1979
1979 establishments in Alabama